First National Bank of Custer City, in Custer City, Oklahoma, was built in 1903.  It was listed on the National Register of Historic Placesin 1985.

It is a two-story red brick building,  in plan.  Its only decorative architectural element is a corner parapet with "1903" and "First National Bank" spelled out in white-painted concrete letters.

References

		
National Register of Historic Places in Custer County, Oklahoma
Office buildings completed in 1903